The Goya Award for Best Costume Design (Spanish: Premio Goya al mejor diseño de vestuario) is one of the Goya Awards, Spain's principal national film awards. The award was first presented at the first edition of the Goya Awards with Gerardo Vera being the first winner for his work in El amor brujo.

Javier Artiñano holds the record of most wins in this category with five followed by Yvonne Blake with four, Artiñano also is the most nominated for this award with eleven nominations.

Winners and nominees

1980s

1990s

2000s

2010s

2020s

References

External links
Official site
IMDb: Goya Awards

Goya Awards